Erinn Veronica Westbrook is an American actress, singer, dancer and model. She is known for portraying Bree in Glee, Gabby Richards in the MTV series Awkward, and Magnolia Barnard in the Netflix series Insatiable. As of 2022, she stars as Tabitha Tate in The CW series Riverdale.

Early and personal life
Westbrook was born on Long Island, New York, and moved to Town and Country, Missouri, when she was six years old. She is the second of three children. She has an elder sister, Lauren and a younger brother, Brent C. Both of her siblings are also Harvard graduates. She attended John Burroughs School, where she was the captain of the cheerleading squad and graduated in 2006.

She graduated from Harvard University, the tenth member of her family to do so. She majored in English, American Literature and Language, with a secondary concentration in Dramatic Arts and an advanced certification in Spanish. She wrote for the Harvard Crimson and was president of Students Taking on Poverty.

Career
After interning for CNBC, NBC, and Oxygen, Westbrook began her career as an on-air personality for MTV. She reported on topics pertinent to young people and hosted several features, including SXSW, mtvU's Movers & Changers, a joint venture between the network and the New York Stock Exchange, and MTV Spring Break. Westbrook served as one of the main hosts of MTV Spring Break 2010, 2011, and 2012. In 2012, Westbrook landed a recurring role on Mr. Box Office, starring alongside Bill Bellamy, Vivica Fox, and Jon Lovitz. She also choreographed two episodes in 2013. Westbrook began her career in Los Angeles as a model with Ford Models, appearing in ads for Nike, Vineyard Vines, Seventeen magazine, Cosmopolitan magazine, and others. In fall 2013, Westbrook was featured as one of "Fashion's Next It Girls" in Hollywood by Who, What, Wear.  Westbrook has guest-starred on Switched at Birth, Supernatural, Bones, NCIS and most recently, Jane the Virgin.  She is best known for her role as Bree, the captain of the Cheerios, in the fifth season of Glee. In spring 2014, Westbrook joined the cast of MTV's drama, Awkward, and continued with the show through the fifth and final season in 2016. In summer 2014, Westbrook was invited by the U.S. embassies in Singapore, Malaysia, and Indonesia to visit Southeast Asia as an emissary of Culture and the Arts.

Filmography

References

External links
 
 
 

Year of birth missing (living people)
African-American actresses
American television actresses
Living people
21st-century American actresses
The Harvard Crimson people
21st-century African-American women